

Events

Births
Vincent Drucci (Victor D'Ambrosio), Chicago North Side Gang
Roger Touhy, Chicago Prohibition gangster
Hymie Weiss (Earl Wajciechowsky), Chicago North Side Gang leader

Deaths
Jefferson R. "Soapy" Smith, con artist and gangster in the Western United States

References 

Organized crime
Years in organized crime